Sassoon may refer to:
Sassoon (name)

People
Vidal Sassoon (1928-2012), British hairstylist and businessman

Other uses
 Sassoon (typeface)
 David Sassoon Library, in Mumbai, India
 Sassoon Docks, in Mumbai, India
 Sassoon Eskell (1860–1932), Iraqi statesman and financier
 Sassoon Road, in Hong Kong